Eugen Bacon is an African-Australian computer scientist and author of speculative fiction.

She has been nominated for national and international awards, including the World Fantasy Award, British Science Fiction Association (BSFA) Award, Bridport Prize, Australian Shadows Awards, Ditmar Awards  and Nommo Award for Speculative Fiction by Africans. She also writes nonfiction. She is a professional editor registered with the Institute of Professional Editors (IPEd), and has been a judge in various competitions including the Aurealis Awards, Norma K Hemming Awards  and Australian Shadows Awards.

Early life 

She was born Eugen Matoyo in Tanzania, and she speaks English and Swahili. She lived in the UK before moving to Melbourne, Australia.

Education 

Eugen Bacon has a Master of Science with distinction in distributed computer systems from the University of Greenwich, UK. She also holds a Master of Arts in creative writing and a doctorate in writing, both from Swinburne University of Technology in Australia. She worked in ICT in a service provider role before becoming a writer.

Writing 
She has published short fiction and novels in various genres within the literary speculative fiction field, including black speculative fiction and afrofuturism. She also writes nonfiction including essays, scholarly articles, book chapters and books.

Bibliography

Novels 
 
Mage of Fools (2022)

Novellas 
 Ivory's Story. NewCon Press. 2021

Short fiction 
Collections
Hadithi & the State of Black Speculative Fiction (2020, with Milton Davis)
Black Moon: Graphic Speculative Flash Fiction 2020)
Road to Woop Woop & Other Stories (2020)
Danged Black Things (2021)
Saving Shadows (2021)
Chasing Whispers (2022)

Stories

Anthologies (edited)

Poetry 

 Saving Shadows (2021)
 Speculate: A Collection of Microlit (2021), with Dominique Hecq
Frame of Reference (2021) 
Black Moon (2020)
Her Bitch Dress (2020)
It's Folking Political (2020)

Non-fiction 
Books
An Earnest Blackness (2022)
Writing Speculative Fiction (2019)

Articles
Crafting Stories within a Story 2013
Peaches and Lemons – Peter Temple and Michael Ondaatje 2016
The Writer 2013
Hang Him When He's Not There 2016
Chewing Over the Trials of Unemployment 2011
Crossing genre - exemplars of literary speculative fiction 2017
What is AfroSF? 2018
Writing and Reading Speculative Fiction 2019
The Rise of Black Speculative Fiction 2020
Dark Fiction 2020
Southerly review 2014
Journaling - a path to exegesis in creative research 2014
Review of Angela Meyer's Captives 2015
Being Marcus 2015
Push—a prototype of displaced fiction in the YA literature debate: Breaking the circle of silence 2015
Creative practice - finding the right mentor 2015
Creative research: Mixing methods in practice-led research to explore a model of stories-within-a-story to build a novel 2017
Scholarly exegesis as a memoir 2017
The creation of a toxic utopia in David Coleman's The Shaming 2019
I went looking for AfroSF 2020
Becoming visible: The Rise of Black Speculative Fiction 2020
Review of Ngũgĩ wa Thiong'o's Birth of a Dream Weaver 2020
The Benefit of Our Humanity 2020
The Perfect Nine: The Epic of Gĩkũyũ and Mũmbi 2020
Afrofuturism: A WorldCon Recap, and Some Thoughts 2020
The New Seduction of an Old Literary Crime Classic 2020
Inhabitation-Genni and I 2020 
World building in Ngũgĩ wa Thiong'o's The Perfect Nine: The Epic of Gĩkũyũ and Mũmbi (Worlds Apart: Worldbuilding in Fantasy & Science Fiction, Luna Press Publishing, 2021)
'Trends in black speculative fiction' (Fafnir)
Eugen Bacon: Agents of Change (Locus Magazine)

Critical studies and reviews of Bacon's work
Mage of Fools

Danged Black Thing
 

The Road to Woop Woop and Other Stories
 
 

Claiming T-Mo

Awards and nominations

References 

Year of birth missing (living people)
Living people
Australian speculative fiction writers
Australian people of Tanzanian descent
Tanzanian emigrants to Australia